Hyun Seung-hee (born January 25, 1996), known mononymously as Seunghee, is a South Korean singer and a television personality. She is a member of the South Korean girl group Oh My Girl.

Career

Pre-debut
Seunghee was a regular name in various singing contests and reality shows, including:
 KBS 1TV's Korea Sings (2007), where she won the Excellence Prize;
 SBS TV's Star King (2007), where she was known to the public as the "11-year-old Little BoA"; and
 Mnet's Superstar K 2 (2010), where she made it to the Super Week but did not make it to the top 11 finalists round.

She became a Brave Entertainment trainee in 2012, but transferred to WM Entertainment two years later.

In 2014, she became a credited backing singer for "Full Moon" by Sunmi.

2015–2019: Debut with Oh My Girl & solo activities 

On April 20, 2015, Seunghee made her debut as a member of WM Entertainment's first girl group, Oh My Girl, with their first extended play of the same name. In July 2015, Seunghee made her acting debut in a web drama titled Loss:Time:Life. 

In July 2016, she competed in Girl Spirit, a singing competition show that aimed to highlight the talents of vocalists from lesser-known girl groups.

In June 2019, Seunghee competed in King of Mask Singer under the name "Zoo".

2020–present: Further solo activities 
From November 2020 to January 2021, Seunghee starred in the sports variety show, Not Soccer or Baseball, alongside athletes Chan Ho Park and Lee Young-pyo. 

From February to May 2021, Seunghee together with Kim Hee-chul, Shindong, and Lee Sang-min, hosted Friends, a television program that follows the daily lives of its cast while also showing the emergence of their friendships and romance.

Philanthropy 
In December 2022, Seunghee donated 20 million won by participating in the Million Angels Sharing event organized by the Korea Childhood Cancer Foundation. to support children suffering from childhood cancer.

Discography

Promotional singles

Soundtrack appearances

Appearances on compilations

Filmography

Television series

Television shows

Radio shows

Web shows

Awards  and nominations

Notes

External links

References

1996 births
Living people
South Korean women pop singers
21st-century South Korean women singers
South Korean female idols
People from Chuncheon
Oh My Girl members
K-pop singers
WM Entertainment artists